Meraha is a genus of southeast Asian cellar spiders. The genus was erected in 2018 for two species transferred from Pholcus after a molecular phylogenetic study of Pholcidae. The name is derived from the Malay "merah", meaning "red", referring to the reddish-orange hue of pedipalps.

Species
 it contains seven species:
M. chiangdao (Huber, 2011) – Thailand
M. khene (Huber, 2011) – Laos, Vietnam
M. kinabalu (Huber, 2011) – Malaysia (Borneo)
M. kipungit (Huber, 2016) – Malaysia (Borneo)
M. krabi (Huber, 2016) (type) – Thailand
M. narathiwat (Huber, 2016) – Thailand
M. shuye (Yao & Li, 2017) – Indonesia (Borneo)

See also
 Pholcus
 List of Pholcidae species

References

Further reading

Pholcidae genera
Spiders of Asia